The 1964 Arlington State Rebels football team was an American football team that represented Arlington State College (now known as the University of Texas at Arlington) in the Southland Conference during the 1964 NCAA College Division football season. In their twelfth year under head coach Chena Gilstrap, the team compiled a 3–6–1 record.

Schedule

References

Arlington State
Texas–Arlington Mavericks football seasons
Arlington State Rebels football